The 1934 Australian Championships was a tennis tournament that took place on outdoor Grass courts at the White City Tennis Club, Sydney, Australia from 18 January to 27 January. It was the 27th edition of the Australian Championships (now known as the Australian Open), the 7th held in Sydney, and the first Grand Slam tournament of the year. The singles titles were won by Briton Fred Perry and Australian Joan Hartigan.

Finals

Men's singles

 Fred Perry defeated  Jack Crawford  6–3, 7–5, 6–1

Women's singles

 Joan Hartigan defeated  Mall Molesworth  6–1, 6–4

Men's doubles

 Pat Hughes /  Fred Perry defeated  Adrian Quist /  Don Turnbull 6–8, 6–3, 6–4, 3–6, 6–3

Women's doubles

 Mall Molesworth /  Emily Hood Westacott defeated  Joan Hartigan /  Ula Valkenburg 6–8, 6–4, 6–4

Mixed doubles

 Joan Hartigan /  Edgar Moon defeated  Emily Hood Westacott /  Roy Dunlop 6–3, 6–4

External links
 Australian Open official website

1934
1934 in Australian tennis
January 1934 sports events